The 2015–16 Bangalore Super Division is the thirteenth season of the Bangalore Super Division which is the third tier of the Indian football system and the top tier of the Karnataka football system. SAI and Income Tax were promoted from Bangalore 'A' Division, whereas Ozone FC, a new team launched by Ozone group, also competed in the season. Ozone emerged the champions and Income Tax and SAI were relegated to A division.

Teams

 ASC
 Bengaluru FC
 CIL
 DYES
 Income Tax
 MEG
 Ozone FC
 RWF
 SAI
 South United
 Students Union

Table

Results

References

Bangalore Super Division seasons
4